Wang Zhen (1867–1938), commonly known by his courtesy name Wang Yiting, was a prominent businessman and celebrated modern Chinese artist of the Shanghai School. He also used the art name Bailong shanren and as a devote Buddhist under other names. He was originally from Wuxing in Zhejiang Province, although spent most of his life in the city of Shanghai where he was a successful businessman-banker. Wang Zhen was a master calligrapher as well as a painter of flowers, birds, personages and Buddhist subjects. He was closely associated with and considered the disciple of the painter Wu Changshuo. It is sometimes said that many of his teacher's paintings were from Wang Zhen himself.

Wang Zhen's paintings enjoy a considerable popularity in Japan where he had made many trips in his business and artistic career. The Japanese reading of his courtesy name is Oh Ittei (おう いってい). This Japanese connection was one he shared with his mentor Wu Changshuo.

References
Lang, Shaojun, "Wang Zhen". Encyclopedia of China (Arts Edition), 1st ed.

External links

Wang Zhen and his Painting Gallery at China Online Museum

Qing dynasty painters
Republic of China painters
1867 births
1938 deaths
Painters from Shanghai
19th-century Chinese calligraphers
Buddhist artists